The Caroline Millward House is a historic house at 502 N. 5th Avenue in Maywood, Illinois. The house was built circa 1906 for owner Caroline Millward. It has an American Foursquare design, a simplified style popular in the early twentieth century, with Prairie School elements. The -story house has a typical Foursquare layout, with a rectangular shape, a front porch supported by wide piers, a glazed porch on one side, and a hip roof with a front-facing dormer. The horizontal emphasis of the design is typical of the Prairie School, as are its bands of windows, wood trim, overhanging eaves, and built-in furniture.

The house was added to the National Register of Historic Places on May 22, 1992.

References

Houses on the National Register of Historic Places in Cook County, Illinois
American Foursquare architecture in Illinois
Prairie School architecture in Illinois
Maywood, Illinois